The 2015 BWF World Junior Championships is the seventeenth tournament of the BWF World Junior Championships. It is held in Lima, Peru at the Centro de Alto Rendimiento de La Videna between 4–15 November 2015.

Medalists

Medal table

References

External links
 Official website

 
BWF World Junior Championships
BWF World Junior Championships
BWF World Junior Championships
International sports competitions hosted by Peru
Badminton tournaments in Peru
Sports competitions in Lima
2015 in youth sport